The Conrad Mountains are a narrow chain of mountains,  long, located between the Gagarin Mountains and Mount Dallmann in Queen Maud Land, Antarctica. The Conrad Mountains are a subrange of the Orvin Mountains.

Discovery and naming
The Conrad Mountains were discovered by the Third German Antarctic Expedition (1938–1939), led by Captain Alfred Ritscher, and named for Rear Admiral Heinrich Friedrich (Fritz) Conrad (18 April 1883 – 1 January 1944), director of the meteorological division of the former Marineleitung (German Admiralty). They were surveyed by the Sixth Norwegian Antarctic Expedition, 1956-1960.

See also
 Henry Moraine
 List of mountains of Queen Maud Land

References

External links
 Scientific Committee on Antarctic Research (SCAR)

Mountain ranges of Queen Maud Land
Orvin Mountains